Šárka Jelínková (born 24 January 1968) is a Czech politician and social worker who has been Senator from Kroměříž since March 2016. In 2019 Christian and Democratic Union – Czechoslovak People's Party leadership election she was elected as deputy chairwoman of the Christian and Democratic Union – Czechoslovak People's Party (KDU-ČSL).

Since September 2011 she is director of the Centre for Seniors Garden in Bystřice pod Hostýnem.

References

1968 births
Living people
21st-century Czech women politicians
KDU-ČSL Senators
Palacký University Olomouc alumni
People from Bystřice pod Hostýnem